Terence George Boston, Baron Boston of Faversham,  (21 March 1930 – 23 July 2011) was a British Labour Party politician.

Early life
Boston was born on 21 March 1930, the son of George Boston and his wife Kate Boston (née Bellati). He was educated at Woolwich Polytechnic School for Boys located in the Royal Borough of Greenwich, London. On 4 October 1951, as part of National Service, he was commissioned into the Royal Air Force as a pilot officer. He was given the service number 2501206. He then began studying at King's College London where he joined the University Air Squadron, and transferred to the Royal Air Force Volunteer Reserve, on 3 October 1952. He was promoted to flying officer on 6 April 1954. He graduated with a Bachelor of Laws (LLB) in 1954. He was called to the bar at Inner Temple in 1960. He was promoted to flight lieutenant on 6 April 1960.

Political career
He was elected as Member of Parliament (MP) for Faversham at a by-election on 14 May 1964, following the death of the Labour MP Percy Wells. He was re-elected at the general election in October 1964 and again in 1966, but was defeated at the 1970 general election by the Conservative Roger Moate.

Announced in the 1976 Prime Minister's Resignation Honours, Boston was created a life peer as Baron Boston of Faversham, of Faversham in the County of Kent on 1 July 1976. He served as a deputy speaker of the House of Lords 1991–2008 and twice served as Chairman of Committees,  1994–1997 and 1997–2000.

Personal life
In 1963, Boston married Margaret Head. They did not have any children.

He was a patron of the African Prisons Project, an international non-governmental organisation with a mission improve the welfare of prisoners through education, health and justice.

From 1980 to 1990, Boston was chairman of TVS, the ITV franchise holder for South and South-East England from 1982 until 1992.

Arms

References

Sources

External links 
 

1930 births
2011 deaths
Alumni of King's College London
British barristers
English King's Counsel
Boston of Faversham
Labour Party (UK) MPs for English constituencies
20th-century King's Counsel
UK MPs 1959–1964
UK MPs 1964–1966
UK MPs 1966–1970
UK MPs who were granted peerages
Royal Air Force officers
20th-century Royal Air Force personnel
Life peers created by Elizabeth II